Eyck may refer to:

Eyck Zimmer (born 1969), German born English chef
Carolina Eyck (born 1987), German musician
Charles Eyck (1897-1983), Dutch visual artist
Erich Eyck (1878–1964), German historian

See also
Van Eyck (disambiguation)
Ten Eyck (disambiguation)